The Camelback East Village, also sometimes referred to as East Phoenix or the East Side, is one of the 15 villages that make up Phoenix, Arizona, United States. It is adjacent to the suburbs Paradise Valley and Scottsdale and sits between Piestewa Peak and Camelback Mountain. There are two main cores of the village.  The first is the 24th Street and Camelback Road core and the other is the 44th Street and Van Buren Street core.

See also 
 Arcadia, Phoenix

References 

Urban villages of Phoenix, Arizona